Club Sportivo 2 de Mayo is a Paraguayan football club in the city of Pedro Juan Caballero in Amambay who plays in División Intermedia, Paraguay's second-tier. The club reached promotion to the Primera División Paraguaya in 2005.

History
In January 2006, 2 de Mayo converted into the 43rd Primera División club in the history of the Asociación Paraguaya de Fútbol.

Current squad
As of March 2021.

Honours
Paraguayan Second Division: 1
2005

Paraguayan Third Division: 3
2003, 2011, 2017

Regional Titles (Amambay): 10
1958, 1960, 1980, 1986, 1988, 1995, 1997, 1998, 2002, 2003

Notable players
To appear in this section a player must have either:
 Played at least 125 games for the club.
 Set a club record or won an individual award while at the club.
 Been part of a national team at any time.
 Played in the first division of any other football association (outside of Paraguay).
 Played in a continental and/or intercontinental competition.

1980's
   Mitsuhide Tsuchida
1990's
 –
2000's
  Salustiano Candia (2005–2006)
  Rubén Darío Aguilera (2006)
  Carlos Zorrilla (2007–2008, 2010)
  Josías Paulo Cardoso Júnior (2008, 2009)
  Gustavo Noguera (2008)
  Marcos Barrera (2008–2009)
  Ever Caballero (2009)
  Bibencio Servín (2009–2010)
  Adalberto Goiri (2009–2012)
2010's
  Nicolás Núñez (2011)
Non-CONMEBOL players
  Félix Araujo (2008)
  José María Ramírez (2008)
  Víctor Gutiérrez (2008)

References

External links
 2 de Mayo News 
 Albigol: 2 de Mayo Info

2 de Mayo
Association football clubs established in 1935
1935 establishments in Paraguay